Anthony Grant Herlihy  (born 4 October 1958) is a New Zealand driver and trainer of standardbred racehorses. He was associated with many champions and has been a leading driver of harness horses in New Zealand. In 2014, he was inducted into the New Zealand Trotting Hall of Fame, and he has also been inducted into the Inter Dominion Hall of Fame.

Herlihy was born in Te Puke on 4 October 1958, and was educated at Te Awamutu College. In the 2012 New Year Honours, he was appointed a Member of the New Zealand Order of Merit, for services to harness racing.

Notable race wins
The following are some notable wins during Herlihy's career:

 Badlands Bute - 2004 Great Northern Derby & 2005 New Zealand Trotting Derby
 Buster Hanover - 1998 Inter Dominion Trotting Championship
 Chokin - winner 1993 New Zealand Messenger Championship & New Zealand Trotting Cup, 1993 & 1994 Auckland Pacing Cup
 Christopher Vance - 1990 Great Northern Derby, 1991 New Zealand Messenger Championship, New Zealand Trotting Cup & Auckland Pacing Cup
 Comedy Lad - 1986 Auckland Pacing Cup
 Delft - 2006 Inter Dominion Trotting Championship
 Diamond Field - 1994 Rowe Cup & Inter Dominion Trotting Championship
 Directorship - 1992 Dominion Handicap
 Fly Like An Eagle - 2012 New Zealand Trotting Derby
 Franco Hat Trick - 1998 Chariots of Fire
 Gee du Jour - 1991 Rowe Cup
 Ginger Man - 1995 Chariots of Fire
 Godfrey - 1988 Great Northern Derby
 Gotta Go Cullen - 2008 New Zealand Messenger Championship & Auckland Pacing Cup
 Krug - 2021 Great Northern Derby
 Luxury Liner - 1988 New Zealand Trotting Cup, 1987 & 1988 Auckland Pacing Cup
 Montana Vance - 1994 New Zealand Messenger Championship
 Ohoka Punter - 2013 Great Northern Derby
 One Over Kenny - 2007 & 2009 Rowe Cup
 Pic Me Pockets - 2000 New Zealand Messenger Championship
 Pride Of Petite - 1997 Inter Dominion Trotting Championship
 Sharp And Telford - 1996 Auckland Pacing Cup
 Temporale - 2017 Rowe Cup

See also
 Harness racing in New Zealand

Reference list

1958 births
Living people
People from Te Puke
People educated at Te Awamutu College
New Zealand harness racers
Members of the New Zealand Order of Merit
New Zealand Trotting Cup winners
Inter Dominion winners
New Zealand racehorse trainers